Brayden Point (born March 13, 1996) is a Canadian professional ice hockey centre playing for the Tampa Bay Lightning of the National Hockey League (NHL). The Lightning selected Point in the third round, 79th overall in the 2014 NHL Entry Draft. Point won back-to-back Stanley Cups with the Lightning in 2020 and 2021, leading the playoffs in goal scoring both times, including scoring the Stanley Cup-clinching goal of the 2020 Stanley Cup Finals.

Playing career

Major junior career
Point was drafted in the first round, fourteenth overall by the Moose Jaw Warriors of the 2011 Western Hockey League (WHL) Bantam Draft. In his first full season with the club, he scored 24 goals and 57 points in 67 games. At the conclusion of the season, Point was selected in the fifth round, 167th overall by Traktor Chelyabinsk in the 2013 KHL Junior Draft.

In his NHL draft year, Point led the Warriors in scoring with 36 goals and 91 points in 72 games. His play was rewarded by his participation in the 2014 CHL/NHL Top Prospects Game. Point was ranked 31st among North American skaters by the NHL Central Scouting Services. He was drafted in the third round, 79th overall by the Tampa Bay Lightning in the 2014 NHL Entry Draft.

Point returned to the Warriors for the 2014–15 season, where he once again led the team in scoring. On March 26, 2015, the Lightning signed Point to a three-year, entry-level contract. At the conclusion of the season, Point joined the Lightning's American Hockey League (AHL) affiliate, the Syracuse Crunch. In nine games for the Crunch, he recorded two goals and two assists. He also went scoreless in two postseason games.

In his final year with the Warriors, Point had 35 goals and 88 points in 48 games.

Tampa Bay Lightning 
On October 11, 2016, the Tampa Bay Lightning announced that Point had made the opening night roster out of training camp. Point had had an impressive training camp, recording three preseason goals. Lightning captain Steven Stamkos stated that he believed Point deserved to play in the NHL. Lightning general manager Steve Yzerman stated that the team "felt like he's earned the right for us to give him a look right off the bat." On October 13, 2016, Point made his NHL debut in a 6–4 Lightning win over the visiting Detroit Red Wings. On October 15, 2016, Point recorded his first NHL point, which came when he assisted on Valtteri Filppula's game winner in the 3rd period. The win came against the visiting New Jersey Devils. On October 18, 2016, Point recorded his first NHL shootout goal on his first attempt against goaltender James Reimer of the Florida Panthers. In doing so, Point became the 27th player to score in the shootout before their first career NHL goal. Additionally, he became just the thirteenth player to get the shootout decider before their first career goal. On November 5, 2016, Point recorded his first career NHL goal in a 4–1 win over the visiting New Jersey Devils. The goal came on the power play off a redirection of Nikita Kucherov's slap shot, which beat goaltender Cory Schneider.

On December 29, 2016, the Lightning announced that Point would miss the next 4–6 weeks with an upper body injury. The injury was sustained in a game against the Montreal Canadiens the night before. On January 31, 2017, Point returned to the lineup against the Boston Bruins. On April 10, 2017, Point was named the NHL Third Star of the Week. On January 24, 2018, Point was named to the 2018 NHL All-Star Game. Point replaced injured teammate Victor Hedman. This was Point's first selection to the All-Star Game. After the All-Star break, Point was the 3rd highest scorer on his team, and the top game winning goal scorer, with 10 goals. On April 12, 2018, Point appeared in his first career NHL Stanley Cup playoff game in a 5–2 Lightning win over the visiting New Jersey Devils. Point recorded his first career playoff assist and point in the Lightning victory. On April 14, 2018, Point recorded his first career playoff goal, which came in a 5–3 Lightning win over the Devils at Amalie Arena.

Point recorded his first career natural hat-trick in a 4–3 win over the Pittsburgh Penguins on November 15, 2018. He recorded his three goals within 1 minute and 31 seconds, the sixth-fastest three goals scored in NHL history.

On September 23, 2019, the Lightning re-signed Point to a three-year, $20.25 million extension.

On August 11, 2020, in the first round of the 2020 Stanley Cup playoffs, Point scored the winning goal in game one against the Columbus Blue Jackets in what was the fourth-longest game in NHL history. His goal came with 9:33 left in quintuple overtime. Eight days later, in game five, Point scored in the first overtime period to clinch the series for the Lightning. On September 7, 2020, Point recorded a 5-point night to help the Lightning to a 8–2 win over the New York Islanders in the first game of the Eastern Conference final. The 5-point game established a new franchise record for most points in a single playoff game. Point eventually won the Stanley Cup on September 28, 2020, after leading the league in goals (14). He and Kucherov also became the first teammates to have 30 playoff points (Point (33), Kucherov (34)) since Sidney Crosby (31) and Evgeni Malkin (37) in 2009.

On July 28, 2021, Point signed an eight-year, $76 million extension with the Lightning.

International play

As a 16-year-old, he was named an alternate captain for fifth place Canada Pacific in the 2013 World U-17 Hockey Challenge. As a 17-year-old, Point was chosen to compete with the Canadian U-18 squad at the 2013 Ivan Hlinka Memorial Tournament where he won a gold medal and MVP honours, and he also helped Team Canada capture the bronze medal at the 2014 IIHF World U18 Championships. 
Brayden was also named to the Team Canada roster that captured a gold medal at the 2015 IIHF U20 World Junior Championships.

On April 12, 2017, Point was named to Canada's men's national ice hockey team for the 2017 IIHF World Championship. On May 21, 2017, Point earned a silver medal with Team Canada when they were defeated by Team Sweden 2–1.

Personal life
Point is the younger brother of Riley Point, who also played for the Canmore Eagles. The two brothers played together for four games while Point was a call up.

Career statistics

Regular season and playoffs
Bold indicates led league

International

Awards and honours

Records

Tampa Bay Lightning
 Most playoff goals in a single season, (14) (2020, 2021).

References

External links

1996 births
Canadian expatriate ice hockey players in the United States
Canadian ice hockey centres
Canmore Eagles players
Living people
Moose Jaw Warriors players
National Hockey League All-Stars
Ice hockey people from Calgary
Stanley Cup champions
Syracuse Crunch players
Tampa Bay Lightning draft picks
Tampa Bay Lightning players